The Episcopal Church of St. John the Evangelist, San Francisco, is the third oldest church in the Episcopal Diocese of California. Founded during the Gold Rush era in 1857, the church is currently located in the Mission District of San Francisco.

History
In the 1880s, the church's third Rector was involved in founding the Mission District's St. Luke's Hospital, at the time the only San-Francisco medical institution to treat Chinese workers.

In the 1890s, the church erected a magnificent granite neo-Byzantine basilica, which was dynamited in 1906 to form a firebrake during the great San Francisco earthquake and fire.

The current building dates to 1909 and is in the architectural style known as "Tudor Lantern."

In the late 1960s the church and its rectory and performance space became a hub of counterculture activity under the leadership of Rev. Albert O. Lott, hosting progressive theatre by the Pitschel Players, the "Wednesday Night Fights" in which the vestry engaged with the community on topics of contemporary interest, and various public events, including the wedding of "Country Joe" McDonald, featured on one of the "Country Joe and the Fish" album covers.  There was also an outpouring of musical creativity, notably original works written and produced by the then-choirmaster Jeff Davis, now carillonist for the Berkeley, CA carillon.  

In the 1970s, in reaction to the continuing deterioration of the neighborhood around the church caused by the erection of 1950's housing projects, rector Winston Ching founded St. John's Educational Thresholds Center, a tutoring program for mission youth.

In the 1970s and 1980s, the church's proximity to the neighborhood of Castro allowed it to attract a large gay membership. Since that time, the church has been an advocate for Lesbian, gay, bisexual, and transgender rights in the larger Anglican church.

In 2007, the church celebrated its 150th anniversary.

External links
Official Website
The Episcopal Diocese of California

Churches in San Francisco
Episcopal church buildings in California
Religious organizations established in 1857
Anglican dioceses established in the 19th century
Mission District, San Francisco
1857 establishments in California
Buildings and structures destroyed in the 1906 San Francisco earthquake
Anglo-Catholic church buildings in the United States